Red Bull Racing, also simply known as Red Bull or RBR and currently competing as Oracle Red Bull Racing, is a Formula One racing team, racing under an Austrian licence and based in the United Kingdom. It is one of two Formula One teams owned by conglomerate company Red Bull GmbH, the other being Scuderia AlphaTauri (previously Scuderia Toro Rosso). The Red Bull Racing team has been managed by Christian Horner since its formation in 2005.

Red Bull had Cosworth engines in 2005 and Ferrari engines in 2006. The team used engines supplied by Renault between 2007 and 2018 (from 2016 to 2018, the Renault engine was re-badged "TAG Heuer" following the breakdown in the relationship between Red Bull and Renault in ). The works Honda partnership culminated in 2021 following Red Bull driver Max Verstappen's World Drivers' Championship victory, with Verstappen also winning the championship in 2022. Honda left the sport officially after 2021, but will continue to supply complete engines from Japan to the team partly under Red Bull Powertrains branding until the end of 2025.

History

Origins 

Jackie Stewart sold his team to the Ford Motor Company late in 1999, and Ford made the decision to rebrand the team Jaguar Racing with little subsequent success over the next five years.

The Jaguar Racing Formula One constructor and racing team was put up for sale in September 2004 when Ford decided it could "no longer make a compelling business case for any of its brands to compete in Formula One." Red Bull, an energy drinks company, agreed its purchase of Jaguar Racing on the final day of the sale, 15 November 2004. BBC Sport reported that Ford asked bidders for a symbolic US$1 in return for a commitment to invest US$400 million in the team over three Grand Prix seasons. The team continued to have access to the Cosworth engine developed for their 2005 chassis, and the operation continued under the new title. Christian Horner was installed as the new team boss and lined up David Coulthard and Christian Klien to drive for the team.

Red Bull Racing was not the start of Red Bull's involvement in Formula One, as they sponsored Sauber from 1995 to 2004. After buying a Formula One team of its own, Red Bull ended its long-term partnership with the Swiss team. Red Bull also runs a young drivers programme, Red Bull Junior Team, whereby Red Bull sponsors promising young drivers. High-profile drivers who have received this backing include Enrique Bernoldi, Christian Klien, Patrick Friesacher, Vitantonio Liuzzi and Scott Speed. Red Bull also sponsors many drivers and teams competing in the Formula 2 Championship, Formula One's "feeder" series.

Cosworth engines (2005)

2005 season 

Red Bull's owner, Dietrich Mateschitz, reportedly tried to recruit former Formula One driver and BMW Motorsport chief (and fellow Austrian) Gerhard Berger to help guide the team through its debut season. However, this was never realised. For , the chassis was christened the RB1. Red Bull Racing used Cosworth engines in its maiden year due to the ease of continuing with the engine Jaguar Racing used.

Former McLaren driver David Coulthard led the team. Coulthard was chosen for his experience, considered ideal to help lead the fledgling team. At first, it was announced that Klien and Liuzzi would swap driving duty every four races, but by the end of the season, Liuzzi had appeared only four times.

Red Bull's first year in Formula One was a massive success compared to its predecessors, Jaguar Racing. They were 6th in the Constructors' Championship for most of the season, only beaten by the fast-improving BAR Hondas at the end of the season. Coulthard, after a poor 2003 and 2004 with McLaren, was a revelation for the team while Klien showed that he had vastly improved from 2004. Overall they scored 34 points; 24 for Coulthard, 9 for Klien and 1 for Liuzzi. Red Bull was a consistent point and occasional podium challenger for most of their debut season.

American driver Scott Speed, who rose through the ranks in the American equivalent of Red Bull Junior Team, Red Bull Driver Search, was Red Bull Racing's third driver in 2005 for the Canadian and United States Grands Prix. Speed was attractive to Red Bull because of his American nationality which would raise the profile of both Red Bull and Formula One in America, a market where the sport has traditionally struggled to make an impact.

Ferrari engines (2006)

2006 season 

This coincided with a rule change mandating the use of V8 engines, making it likely that both Red Bull Racing and Ferrari would use the same specification engine. Red Bull Racing continued to use Michelin tyres, rather than the Bridgestones used by Ferrari.

On 8 November 2005, Red Bull Racing hired Adrian Newey, the highly successful McLaren technical director.

On 15 December 2005, the team's second car, the Red Bull RB2, hit the track for the first time. David Coulthard completed a handful of laps of the Silverstone circuit in England, and declared the new car was a "sexy looking thing". In early testing Red Bull was plagued with cooling problems and overheating of car components.

At the opening race of the 2006 season in Bahrain, Christian Klien qualified eighth (ahead of Giancarlo Fisichella's Renault and both BMWs). Coulthard had problems when he flat-spotted a tyre fighting with Nick Heidfeld, and finished 10th; the cooling problems returned when his Ferrari engine expired on the slowing down lap, forcing a grid penalty for the following race. In Malaysia, Coulthard made up several places from the back of the grid but was forced to retire with hydraulic problems, while Klien had an opening lap incident with Kimi Räikkönen and after pitting for repairs also retired with hydraulic failure. Coulthard got a point in Australia after Scott Speed was penalised for passing him under the yellow flags. The following races were marred with retirements and lowly finishes.

Coulthard finished 3rd at Monaco, the team's first podium finish. Team boss Christian Horner said before the race that if one of his cars were to finish on the podium, he would jump into a swimming pool at the track naked. He ended up jumping into the pool wearing only a red cape. Coincidentally both Stewart Grand Prix and Jaguar Racing, the team's predecessors, also scored their maiden podiums at that race.

Coulthard scored a point at Montreal, passing Jenson Button in the closing stages of the race despite starting in last place due to an engine change that warranted a grid penalty. Klien also fared well, driving the second RB2 to 11th position. At the  Klien retired along with eight other cars including Toro Rosso driver Scott Speed on the first lap after a series of first corner incidents. Coulthard finished 7th.

The team finished 7th in the FIA Constructors' Championship, with 16 points, five points ahead of the struggling Williams team. Coulthard (14 pts) finished in 13th place in the drivers' standings, the departed Klien (2 pts) was classified in 18th position. Klien's replacement, Robert Doornbos, failed to score any points.

Renault engines (2007–2015)

Customer era (2007–2010)

2007 season

 saw the debut of the Adrian Newey designed RB3. After lengthy discussions over Red Bull Racing's obligation to continue to use Ferrari engines for 2007, the team announced on 31 August 2006 they would use customer Renault engines for the 2007 season, the Ferrari contract being passed to Scuderia Toro Rosso.

The team announced on 7 August 2006 that it had signed Mark Webber to drive alongside Coulthard for the 2007 season, replacing Christian Klien who ended his association with the team. Klien was replaced by Robert Doornbos for the last three races of 2006. Doornbos became the team's non-racing third driver for 2007. In 2007 Red Bull officially became an Austrian constructor by receiving an Austrian licence, though continued to operate from the same base in Britain.

Despite qualifying in 7th place for his home race in Melbourne, Mark Webber finished down in 13th due to a persistent problem with a fuel flap that closed as the pit mechanics went to put the fuel in and when it was opened it remained open until the next pit stop greatly increasing drag and decreasing airflow over the rear wing. It was worse for Coulthard however, who crashed heavily with Williams's Alexander Wurz in the late stages of the race. Malaysia was more of the same for Webber, while Coulthard retired with brake problems. However, in Bahrain the team showed improving pace, and Coulthard and Webber were running 7th (with Coulthard starting from the back) and 8th respectively before reliability problems put both out of the race in quick succession. However, in testing at Barcelona Coulthard has set the fastest lap in the new configuration of the circuit (since superseded by Felipe Massa). Coulthard secured the team's first points by scoring a gritty 5th with a faulty gearbox on his closing laps in Spain, while Webber was dogged with hydraulic problems all weekend, eventually retiring from the race after failing to set a competitive lap in qualifying. The performance hike the team experienced at the Catalan track left both drivers and team optimistic about their future results, with reliability troubles being as much a focus as the increase of their already competitive pace.

Red Bull Racing further strengthened their technical department by hiring Geoff Willis as Technical Director on 17 July 2007.

After this, the drivers seemed to have a stroke of good luck during the unpredictable and exciting 2007 European Grand Prix in which Webber finished 3rd, his second career podium. Coulthard backed it up with a strong 5th which was made all the more impressive by the fact he started 20th on the grid after the team mistakenly kept him in the pits too long resulting in him not being able to complete another qualifying lap.

Red Bull had a strong end to the season. Webber came close to victory at the Japanese Grand Prix, but he was involved in a crash with Sebastian Vettel. During the same race, Coulthard again demonstrated his wet-weather ability and finished 4th.

At the Chinese Grand Prix, Red Bull had a competitive qualifying session. Coulthard achieved 5th on the grid, along with Webber in 9th.

2008 season

Red Bull presented the RB4 at the Jerez circuit on 16 January and announced that Sébastien Buemi would be their test and reserve driver for 2008 combining it with his GP2 drive with the Arden International GP2 team.

After Webber retired from the opening round he went on to score 5 consecutive points finishes. Coulthard had a tougher start to the 2008 campaign due to poor qualifying, but a 3rd place at Canada gave Red Bull their first podium since the 2007 European Grand Prix. At the half-way mark, the team had notched up 24 points – the same as their total for the 2007 season – and were locked in a fierce battle with Toyota and Renault for 4th in the Constructors' Championship. The team had also resolved the reliability problems that had dogged them the previous year.

However, as the season progressed, Red Bull failed to keep up with their competitors. Red Bull scored just 5 points in the last 10 races, and Toro Rosso – the Red Bull 'B team' – had overhauled their total by the season's end and won the rain-affected , becoming the first Red Bull-owned team to win a race. This fact led many to claim that the Renault engine powering the Red Bull was lacking in horsepower compared to the Ferrari and Mercedes engines. For the 2009 season, Renault was allowed to equalise the difference in engine power compared to their competitors after the single-year freeze in engine development from 2007.

2009 season

For , Red Bull Racing launched their new RB5 chassis virtually on 8 February utilising a 3D computer-generated video narrated by Sebastian Vettel. The physical launch of the car was held the next day. Mark Webber qualified in third on the grid. The next day, Vettel won, with Webber second. Vettel's victory, in rain-soaked conditions, marked Red Bull Racing's first-ever win (although the team's predecessor, Stewart GP, had won the 1999 European Grand Prix courtesy of Johnny Herbert).

In the next race at Bahrain after qualifying 3rd, Vettel finished second behind Jenson Button and collected another eight world championship points. In Turkey, Webber and Vettel finished second and third respectively. At the  the car had new upgrades and Sebastian Vettel won after qualifying on pole position, ending championship leader Jenson Button's run of four straight wins. Another 1–2 finish for the team was achieved at the season-ending , this time with Vettel finishing ahead of Webber.

Vettel finished second in the Drivers' Championship with 84 points, 11 behind Jenson Button. Mark Webber finished fourth with 69.5 points. The team also finished second in the Constructors' Championship with 153.5 points, 18.5 points behind Brawn GP.

2010 season

For the 2010 season, the team retained both Mark Webber and Sebastian Vettel, with Renault remaining the engine supplier.

Vettel led the race until he slowed due to a spark-plug failure, while the two Ferraris and Lewis Hamilton overtook Vettel. Vettel finished fourth, and Webber finished eighth.

In Australia, Vettel again took pole, with Webber in the second position. Vettel led the race and again looked set to take the race, but he reported a vibration of one of the front wheels on his car. The problem seemed to subside, and the decision was made to keep him on the track rather than pit him. A few corners later, the problem struck again, and Vettel ran off the track and subsequently retired, due to brake failure. Webber got wheelspin off the line and gave up one position on the run to the first right-handed corner. Subsequent errors led to him dropping a few more places, and near the end of the race, he crashed with Hamilton, destroying his front wing. He pitted to get a new one, and finished ninth, scoring two points.

In Malaysia, Webber took pole with Vettel in the third position. Vettel managed to pass both Nico Rosberg and Webber before the first corner, leading for all bar two laps en route to his and the team's first victory of the year. Webber led the other two laps and eventually finished second, with the team moving up into third in the Constructors' Championship.

The team once again scored pole position in China, when Vettel managed to set a faster time than Webber, who completed the front row. Webber overtook Vettel at the start, but both were overtaken by Fernando Alonso, who was later given a penalty for a false start. The race was then hit by rain and Jenson Button made the best strategy call and won the race, Vettel finished sixth whilst Webber was eighth. This left Vettel and Webber fifth and seventh in the Drivers' Championship respectively, and the team in third in the Constructors' Championship.

At the  the two drivers were the other way around, with Webber on pole position and Vettel second on the grid. Webber won the race without too much trouble. Vettel, however, suffered brake problems and dropped to fourth – this became third when Hamilton had a puncture and crashed from second on the penultimate lap.

Webber won the race and Vettel finished in second place.
After the race, Webber was leading the championship after being in seventh after China, with Vettel in second place (this was only by countback though because both drivers were on 78 points). The team was leading the Constructors' Championship.

Following the pit stops, Webber and Vettel were running first and second until lap 40, when Vettel attempted to overtake Webber, leading to a collision between the two. Webber finished third, while Vettel was forced to retire. Neither driver took 100% of responsibility while senior members of the team alluded to the thought that Webber had not provided "enough room" for Vettel.

In Canada, Hamilton took pole position – the first non-Red Bull pole of the year. Webber and Vettel were second and third respectively in qualifying before the pair finished fourth and fifth in the race. The team admitted that it was a track that the car struggled with.

Webber collided with the Lotus of Heikki Kovalainen, flipping his Red Bull car into a somersault before landing and crashing into a tyre barrier.

Webber, who started from second, won after leading for the entire race.

Vettel qualified in pole position in front of the two Ferraris in Germany, but finished his home race behind the pair in third place. Webber qualified in fourth but finished in sixth behind both the McLaren cars. During the race Felipe Massa controversially let Fernando Alonso past into the lead to win the race after a message from the team. Red Bull team principal Christian Horner said: "That was the most blatant team order ever". He also criticised Ferrari for not letting their drivers race each other.

He was second behind Webber, who started second and was then given a drive-through penalty for exceeding the ten-car maximum distance between himself and the safety car. This cost him second place and he finished third. Webber won the race after using his super-soft tyres for over half the race to build up a lead to keep him ahead after his stop. Webber won with Fernando Alonso ten seconds behind in second place.

The  saw Webber claim pole position, despite McLaren and Ferrari having a straight-line speed advantage. At the start, the anti-stall device on Webber's car came on, dropping the Australian to 5th. Vettel, meanwhile in 3rd (after starting 4th) was chasing Jenson Button for 2nd place when he collided with the Brit at the Bus Stop. After sensing an inside passing opportunity, Vettel attempted to quickly change direction while under braking, causing the car to spear into the side of Button's McLaren. Button retired from the race, while Vettel was able to pit for repairs. He subsequently received a drive-through penalty for his action and suffered a rear tyre puncture while attempting to overtake Vitantonio Liuzzi, finishing 15th. Webber was able to capitalise on the DNF of Button and Alonso, as well as a mistake by Renault's Robert Kubica, during his pit stop, and finish 2nd, behind race winner Hamilton.

Vettel had brake binding problems for a short period, around lap 20, and he too dropped back a place but was then back on the pace. Webber was held back by Nico Hülkenberg in the latter part of the race, until he passed, and finished 6th. Vettel stayed out on soft tyres until the penultimate lap, doing better lap times than Webber and overtaking Mark when he pitted, to finish fourth.

On lap 18, Webber spun and hit the wall, and hit the Mercedes of Nico Rosberg, causing both drivers to retire. Worse was to come for the team when Vettel's engine failed just 10 laps from the finish, while he was in the lead, and the German retired and handed his lead to Fernando Alonso in the Ferrari. Red Bull had suffered their first double retirement since the 2008 Australian Grand Prix and as a result, Webber lost his championship lead and Vettel's engine failure prevented him from leading the championship for the first time in 2010, but the team still led the Constructors' Championship.

In doing so Red Bull became the first Austrian team to win the Formula One Constructors' Championship. Christian Horner stated that the main goal had been achieved and that now his remaining aim was to win the Drivers' Championship and put the icing on the cake of Red Bull's year. In some other teams, the drivers would have been told to change positions, to improve better placed Mark Webber's chances to win the drivers' title in the last race, but the team insisted that the faster driver should win the race, and kept being reluctant to give any orders of the kind "let your teammate pass" to their drivers.

In the final race at Abu Dhabi, Sebastian Vettel won the race and the Formula One Drivers' Championship. Red Bull finished the year with a total of 9 Grand Prix victories with five going to Sebastian Vettel and four going to Mark Webber. Red Bull claimed a total of 15 pole positions with 10 going to Vettel and five going to Webber. The team scored six fastest laps three scored by Vettel and three scored by Webber. Horner also praised the sportsmanship of both drivers stating that they conducted themselves in a well orderly and mannered fashion.

Renault full-works partnership era (2011–2015)

2011 season

Red Bull Racing was officially promoted to Renault's full-works partnership status, receiving free engines as Renault's full-works constructor team was rebranded to Lotus Renault GP. Both Sebastian Vettel and Mark Webber were retained by the team for the  season, as was engine supplier Renault. Vettel defended his world title – becoming the ninth driver to do so – after winning eleven of the season's races, and also achieved 15 pole positions during the season, breaking Nigel Mansell's record from the  season. Webber finished the season in third place in the championship, taking one victory, in the final race of the season in Brazil. The team also defended their respective title, as they finished the season with 650 points in the Constructors' Championship, 153 points ahead of the next closest team, McLaren. Nissan's premium automotive brand Infiniti joined Red Bull Racing as an official partner for the 2011 and 2012 seasons which saw Infiniti logos appear on the race car, drivers overalls and team kit.

2012 season

For the 2012 season, Red Bull retained the duo of Sebastian Vettel and Mark Webber from the previous three years. Webber was signed on a one-year contract extension while Vettel continued under his current multi-year agreement, ending at the end of 2014. Vettel won the Drivers' Championship for a third consecutive time in 2012 making him the youngest triple World Champion, surpassing Ayrton Senna.

2013 season

The team was renamed Infiniti Red Bull Racing for the 2013 season following the announcement that premium automotive brand Infiniti had become Title Partner and Vehicle Performance Partner of the team. Infiniti Red Bull continued with drivers Sebastian Vettel and Mark Webber for the fifth consecutive season. As with 2012, Webber was signed on a single year contract while Vettel continued to honour his current multi-year agreement.

In Australia, the first race of the season, Vettel placed the new RB9 on pole position but struggled in the race finishing in 3rd place behind title rivals of 2012, Kimi Räikkönen and Fernando Alonso whilst teammate Webber finished in sixth place. In Malaysia the team went better with Vettel again putting the RB9 on pole, but unlike in Australia winning the race, albeit under heavy controversy. Vettel won the race after disobeying team orders, and so despite the 1–2 result, the race was overshadowed by Vettel's actions. In China, the third race of the season, Vettel qualified in 9th whilst Webber qualified 14th after an issue with his fuel pick up led him to have to stop the car on the track. Infiniti Red Bull failed to give the FIA a 1-litre fuel sample, therefore, placing Webber at the back of the grid. The downfall of his performance was matched when a collision and then a dislodged wheel nut led to Webber not completing the race. Vettel finished in 4th, retaining his lead in the World Championship. In Bahrain, the fourth race of the season, Vettel qualified in second place behind Nico Rosberg. Webber qualified fifth but after a 3 place grid penalty started the race in seventh. In the race, Webber failed to improve on his qualifying position finishing 7th whilst his teammate won the race in a dominating fashion. After the fourth race of the season, Infiniti Red Bull finished the first round of flyaway races leading both the Drivers' and Constructors' Championships. Sebastian Vettel extended his contract with Infiniti Red Bull Racing until the end of 2015, despite interests in racing for Ferrari and Mercedes. It was then announced before the Italian Grand Prix that Daniel Ricciardo, the Toro Rosso driver, would replace Webber for the 2014 season, ending talk of Lotus's Kimi Räikkönen taking Webber's seat.

2014 season

Infiniti Red Bull started the season with reigning World Champion Sebastian Vettel and Daniel Ricciardo who replaced Mark Webber after he had announced in 2013 that he would be moving to Porsche in the World Endurance Championship for 2014.

In pre-season testing, it became clear, not just from Red Bull, but other Renault teams that the Renault engine was very unreliable and down on power compared to the Ferrari and Mercedes engines. Renault struggled to get the new hybrid engine to function properly all through testing with the combustion engine, the kinetic recovery system, and the turbo all unable to work as one.

In the race itself, Ricciardo finished second while Vettel retired after just three laps due to a power unit failure. However, after the race, Ricciardo was disqualified for violating the FIA's new rule of capping fuel use at 100 kg per hour in each race. He thus lost his podium finish. Red Bull appealed this decision on 14 April but lost their case.

At the  Vettel qualified second while Ricciardo qualified fifth. On lap 49 Ricciardo had to retire due to a technical failure while Vettel went on to finish third and earn his first podium finish of the season. At the  Ricciardo qualified third, but dropped to 13th due to his ten-place grid penalty from the previous week. Vettel qualified 11th. Ricciardo managed to finish fourth, obtaining his first championship points of the season. Vettel finished sixth. Ricciardo finished in 4th again, nearly 25 seconds ahead of his teammate Vettel, who finished 5th.

Vettel did not participate in Q3 due to problems with his gearbox, which ultimately needed to be replaced, incurring a five-place grid penalty. Despite starting from the 15th position, Vettel managed to finish the race in 4th, setting the fastest lap of the race in the process. In Canada, Ricciardo won the race, achieving his first career victory in Formula One.

He also mocked Renault in an interview with Servus TV by saying that "the big difference between Mercedes and Renault is that when a driver with a Mercedes engine pushes the overtake button his car goes faster. When our drivers, which have a Renault engine, push the button, the car stops!"

2015 season

Daniel Ricciardo returned for a second season with the team. At the previous year's , the team announced that Vettel would leave after the 2014 season. He was replaced by Daniil Kvyat for 2015, who had spent a single season with the junior Toro Rosso team.

2015 for Infiniti Red Bull was seen initially as a continuous resurgence for the team. It was expected from the progress Renault made with the engine in 2014 that in 2015 it would be close to the Mercedes duo of Hamilton and Rosberg. However, it quickly became apparent that reliability, power, and drivability were all major issues that plagued the team through the season.

At the  Ricciardo qualified 7th while Kvyat qualified 13th. Kvyat failed to start the race due to a gearbox failure, whilst Ricciardo finished the race in sixth, a lap down from the race winner, Lewis Hamilton. The team scored their best finish in Hungary, where Ricciardo and Kvyat finished 2–3. Lewis Hamilton won the race and, as a result, his third Formula One World Championship.

Come the end of the season, it was the first winless season for Infiniti Red Bull since 2008, and come seasons end, Red Bull wanted to end its partnership with Renault due to the lack of progress and confidence expressed by Renault. Red Bull would however be unable to agree to have another engine instead opting to run Renault engines for the 2016 season but rebadged as TAG-Heuer.

They ended the season in fourth place on 187 points with Kvyat in seventh (95 points) and Ricciardo in eighth (92 points), their lowest finish position in seven years.

TAG Heuer-badged Renault engines (2016–2018)

2016 season 

For 2016, Red Bull Racing used Renault engines branded as TAG Heuer due to their public breakdown with Renault in 2015. Infiniti also departed as a main sponsor due to the Renault breakdown. The team announced on 17 March 2016, one day before the Australian Grand Prix weekend, that they had formed a new technology partnership with Aston Martin, for the new season.

Verstappen eventually won the Spanish Grand Prix, becoming the youngest ever Grand Prix winner.

2016 in general was a much stronger season for Red Bull Racing than 2015, especially after Max Verstappen replaced Daniil Kvyat. This may be because Daniel Ricciardo was pushed much more by Verstappen than he was by Kvyat, Ricciardo stating he has learned from Verstappen's driving techniques to improve as a driver. Red Bull would go on to collect podium finishes with Max Verstappen in Austria and Silverstone, with Daniel Ricciardo in Monaco, Budapest and in Singapore, with both Verstappen and Ricciardo being on the podium in Germany and Malaysia. Daniel Ricciardo collected his 4th career victory in Malaysia after Lewis Hamilton's engine failure. Verstappen had challenged for the victory but was compromised due to an incident at the start between Vettel and Rosberg leading to Verstappen referring to Vettel as 'crazy'. This incident was the latest flare-up between Vettel and Verstappen after the two disagreed over a first corner collision at the Belgian Grand Prix which resulted in Max failing to score at a race where he started on the front row, outqualifying his teammate for only the 2nd time, in which a large number of Dutch fans had traveled to see him race.

Towards the end of the Brazilian Grand Prix Verstappen dropped to 14th after changing back to wet tyres. He then gained an incredible 11 places in the closing 16 laps finishing on the podium in third.

Red Bull Racing finished 2nd in the Constructors' Championship that year, with Daniel Ricciardo taking 3rd in the Drivers' Championship.

2017 season 

In 2017, Red Bull Racing retained their 2016 driver line-up and continued using TAG Heuer-branded Renault engines. In the first race in Australia, Ricciardo retired on lap 25, in a weekend plagued with problems for him, while Verstappen finished 5th.

He was also involved in three first-lap collisions that ended in retirement.

In the Drivers' Championship, Ricciardo finished fifth with 200 points and Verstappen sixth with 168 points. The team finished third in the Constructors' Championship with 368 points.

2018 season 

Ricciardo and Verstappen were both retained by the team for the 2018 season. On 25 September 2017, it was announced that Aston Martin would become Red Bull Racing's title sponsor from 2018.

The team achieved a podium with Verstappen, during the  securing the 3rd place, while Ricciardo achieved 5th place. At the  Red Bull had a dominant car due to its highly efficient high down-force setup. Ricciardo scored a pole position, and despite running into an engine issue costing him power, he eventually won the race. This incident re-ignited the bad relationship with its engine manufacturer, Renault. Meanwhile, Verstappen crashed during free practice 3 and started from 20th on the grid, finishing the race in 9th place. This race also put an end to a streak of incidents for Verstappen. Monaco was also the last race that saw Daniel Ricciardo on the podium with Red Bull, with him parting ways with the team and joining rival team Renault at the end of the season.

The second half of the season saw great form from Verstappen and good development of the car, as Verstappen scored 6 out of 8 possible podiums, and was the driver which scored the most points following the 2018 World Champion Lewis Hamilton. Ricciardo had a spree of mechanical issues and retirements during the second half of the season, with him getting 7 retirements in total and no podiums after the first six races coming to the end of the season.

Verstappen was also finding himself in a back-to-back win at the Brazilian Grand Prix but clashed with rival Esteban Ocon as the latter tried to unlap himself, costing him the victory. Following the race the drivers conflicted, resulting in 2 days of public service for Verstappen, which he completed on 9 February 2019. Ricciardo's multiple retirements would end up costing both himself and Red Bull key points in the Drivers' and Constructors' Championships. Verstappen would finish the 2018 season in 4th place, just 3 points behind Kimi Räikkönen while Daniel Ricciardo would finish the season in 6th place, behind Valtteri Bottas. Red Bull would finish the season in 3rd place behind Mercedes and Ferrari.

Works Honda engines (2019–2021)

2019 season 

Preceding the 2018 , Red Bull Racing confirmed they are to utilise full-works Honda power units from 2019 to 2020, signing a two-year deal and thus ending their twelve-year partnership with Renault.

On 3 August 2018, it was announced that Ricciardo would be leaving the team at the end of the season to join Renault, signing a two-year contract with them. Pierre Gasly was promoted from Toro Rosso to replace him.

On 12 August 2019, it was announced that Alex Albon would move to Red Bull Racing for the rest of the season, replacing Gasly, who returned to Toro Rosso.

2020 season 

The team retained Max Verstappen and Alex Albon as their line-up for the 2020 season.

2021 season 

In October 2020, engine manufacturer Honda announced it would end its full-works participation in Formula One at the end of the 2021 season. Verstappen was contracted to continue racing for the team with experienced Mexican Sergio Pérez becoming his teammate as Albon took the reserve driver role. Verstappen took pole position at the season-opening Bahrain Grand Prix. Verstappen was later out-qualified by Sergio Pérez at the 2021 Emilia Romagna Grand Prix, but went on to win the race and be just one point behind Lewis Hamilton in the Drivers' Championship standings. At the Monaco Grand Prix, Red Bull Racing took the lead of the Constructors' Championship for the first time since the 2013 Brazilian Grand Prix as a result of another Verstappen win and a poor result for Mercedes. Verstappen also took the lead in the championship for the first time in his career after the race. In the Azerbaijan Grand Prix Verstappen led the majority of the race and looked set to win before a late-race tyre blowout. Pérez won the race. Verstappen then took pole and won the next three races while Pérez took one more podium in France to grow Red Bull's championship lead.

At Silverstone, Red Bull was beaten in Friday qualifying but Verstappen won the sprint on Saturday to claim a 4th consecutive pole position. During the race, Hamilton and Verstappen made contact at Copse corner, resulting in Verstappen crashing out of the race. In Hungary, both Red Bulls suffered severe damage in a first-lap accident triggered by Mercedes' Valtteri Bottas. Pérez was out of the race, Verstappen managed to salvage a 9th-place finish. In Spa Verstappen took pole and won a rain-shortened race in which half points were awarded. In Italy, Hamilton and Verstappen made contact yet again at the Rettifilo chicane which resulted in both drivers retiring from the race, and Verstappen receiving a 3-place grid penalty for the next race, as the stewards judged him at fault for the collision. At the Abu Dhabi Grand Prix, Verstappen took pole position, his first since Austin. He secured his first world title and a first championship for the team since 2013 with a last lap overtake on Hamilton.

On 10 October 2022, the FIA announced that Red Bull were one of two teams who had breached the 2021 Financial Regulations applicable during the season, with Red Bull committing what was described as "a Procedural Breach and a Minor Financial Overspend (less than 5% of the Cost Cap)". On 28 October 2022, the FIA announced that Red Bull had entered an Accepted Breach Agreement; in summary Red Bull were in breach of 13 points of non-compliance. The agreement resulted in a $7m fine and a 10% reduction in permitted aerodynamic research.

RBPT-badged works Honda engines (2022–present)

2022 season 

Following Honda's withdrawal as a works entity after 2021, an engine development freeze lobbied by Red Bull allowed them to sign a deal with Honda to use their engines until the end of 2024. To maintain the engines, they formed a company named Red Bull Powertrains Limited and took over part of Honda's Milton Keynes facility. Despite their withdrawal, Honda will develop and manufacture a power unit for the 2022 season – which will then be used up to the end of 2024 – and offer assistance. The Honda-Red Bull deal was later extended to 2025.

American multinational software company Oracle became the team's title sponsor for the season.

On 27 July, in Morocco, official information was published on the approval of an application submitted jointly by Porsche and Red Bull GmbH in which Porsche acquired 50% of the shares in Red Bull Technology, the parent company of Red Bull Racing and its Formula One program. This application had to be filed with the antitrust authorities of up to 20 countries, including outside the European Union. The press release was due to go out for the Austrian GP, however the FIA ​​did not approve the regulations for the 2026 engines before 29 June as planned, delaying official confirmation of Porsche's entry into Formula One

However, after months of speculation, Porsche AG confirmed in September that talks with Red Bull GmbH would not continue. The intention was to reach an engine and team partnership, based on equal footing but the negotiations never came to fruition. Instead, on 3 February 2023, Ford Motor Company announced a partnership with Red Bull Powertrains that would begin during the 2026 season, supplying power units for Red Bull Racing and Scuderia AlphaTauri.

Max Verstappen secured the sixth Drivers' World Championship for the team at the Japanese Grand Prix, dominating much of the season winning 15 out of 22 races. He then won the United States Grand Prix to secure the Constructors' World Championship for Red Bull, their fifth overall and the first since 2013.

Pit stop records 

At the 2019 Brazilian Grand Prix, the team set the world record for the world's fastest pitstop with a time of 1.82 seconds while servicing Max Verstappen, a record they still hold .

Corporate information

Image and marketing 

Red Bull has been very vocal about wanting to make Formula One 'fun' again. One way in which they went about doing that was by employing Mark Gallagher, who was head of marketing for nine years at Jordan, itself an exciting brand in the late 1990s. Red Bull also started The Red Bulletin, a sports and adventure magazine that is released four times per race weekend and distributed to the paddock and members of the public from behind the main grandstand at each track.

In the 2006 Monaco Grand Prix, they supported the movie Superman Returns, which continues the line of marketing events begun by the Star Wars: Episode III – Revenge of the Sith promotion of 2005 (in the 2005 race, the pit crew dressed up as clone troopers) and the Ocean's Twelve promotion of 2004, as well as Terminator 3: Rise of the Machines promotion of 2003  when the team ran under the Jaguar Racing banner. When Coulthard finished third in the 2006 race, he donned a Superman cape for his appearance on the podium.

In the 2019 British Grand Prix, 007 logos were used in the livery to replace the Aston Martin logos, to celebrate the 1007th Grand Prix. The cars also had Bond-themed number plates on the underside of their rear wings. Max Verstappen had the number plate from the Aston Martin DB5 from Goldfinger (BMT 216A) while Pierre Gasly's car featured the Aston Martin V8 plate (B549 WUU) from The Living Daylights. Both drivers wore special racing overalls with a print of a single-breasted dinner suit.

Finances 
Red Bull Racing had revenue of $285.4 million and expenses of $284.4 million in 2011.  The revenue came from prize money ($88.8 million), sponsors ($59.7 million), and the remainder from Red Bull.  Expenses included $112.8 million in research and development and $82.7 million in salaries for 605 employees.

Red Bull Technology 

Red Bull Technology, previously Red Bull Racing Holdings, is the parent company of Red Bull Racing set up to design, engineer, and build the cars for its Formula One team, and previously its sister team Scuderia Toro Rosso. Red Bull Technology was regarded as a loop-hole to allow Red Bull to run two teams with the same car from 2007, which had been prohibited in Formula One since the 1980s. Complaints were issued to the FIA from rival teams, but they were discarded by the sport's governing body. Neither Red Bull Racing nor Scuderia Toro Rosso denied they ran fundamentally the same chassis, but claimed the separate development programs, different engines and in their opinion that the chassis was designed by neither team made it legal.

The regulations were changed in 2010 to forbid the use of identical cars between teams, and Toro Rosso no longer had its cars produced by Red Bull Technology. Since then the team designed and built their cars, having built the necessary infrastructure in-house.

Red Bull Technology also supplied Scuderia Toro Rosso, later Scuderia AlphaTauri as their gearbox partner from 2006 to present and KERS supplier from 2011 to 2013. They also served Team Lotus, later Caterham F1 as gearbox supplier from 2011 to 2014 and KERS supplier from 2012 to 2013.

Red Bull Technology uses rFactor Pro driving simulation software.

Red Bull Advanced Technologies 

Red Bull Advanced Technologies (RBAT) is owned by Red Bull GmbH and serves as the commercial technology and engineering services arm of Red Bull Racing. The company is based in the United Kingdom, in a dedicated facility, adjacent to the Red Bull Racing Formula One facilities.

Red Bull Advanced Technologies in collaboration with Aston Martin have developed the Aston Martin Valkyrie sports car.

Red Bull Advanced Technologies in a collaborative effort with Dallara and IndyCar, developed the 'aeroscreen' safety device for usage in the 2020 IndyCar Series.

Red Bull Advanced Technologies announced in June 2022 that they were developing a hypercar completely in house, named the RB17, in line with their Formula One car naming scheme. The car would be designed by Adrian Newey, Chief Technical Officer at Red Bull Racing. Only 50 units are to be made, with production scheduled to begin in 2025.

Scuderia AlphaTauri 

In the autumn of 2005, Red Bull announced that they had purchased the cash-strapped Minardi Formula One team, and it would be known as Scuderia Toro Rosso (Italian for Team Red Bull) from 2006 onwards. Scuderia Toro Rosso (STR) operates as a separate team, but the two share certain technical resources. In 2006 STR used a chassis based on the 2005 Red Bull Racing Red Bull RB1 chassis, originally designed by Jaguar Racing, and Minardi's contracted supply of rev-limited V10 Cosworth engines. It was widely speculated that the 2007 chassis for both teams would be essentially the same Adrian Newey design, although Red Bull was careful to announce that the "STR2 will be built by Red Bull Technology, and Toro Rosso will fully own the intellectual rights of the car". Formula One teams are not allowed to use another team's chassis. STR has been used as a 'B' team for Red Bull Racing, allowing the company to work with more drivers. As of the 2010 season this arrangement was outlawed, and the STR5 is the first Toro Rosso car designed and built in-house.

In 2006, Red Bull Racing driver Vitantonio Liuzzi was given a full-time seat with Scuderia Toro Rosso alongside another Red Bull sponsored driver, Scott Speed. Liuzzi retained his seat in STR for the 2007 season. Sebastian Vettel replaced Speed in the middle of the 2007 season, and Sébastien Bourdais replaced Liuzzi at STR for the  season. Against expectation, Toro Rosso performed well during the 2008 season and Sebastian Vettel won the 2008 Italian Grand Prix. This meant that Toro Rosso took their first win before Red Bull Racing, and helped to secure Vettel a drive with Red Bull Racing for 2009 when he also took that team's first win. For , the team was rebranded as Scuderia AlphaTauri, after AlphaTauri, Red Bull's fashion brand achieved their maiden Grand Prix win under the new name at the 2020 Italian Grand Prix. The race marked Pierre Gasly's first career race victory and the first for a French driver since Olivier Panis won the 1996 Monaco Grand Prix 24 years prior.

Fictional racing car 

The Red Bull X2010, originally named Red Bull X1, is a fictional car featured in the video games Gran Turismo 5, Gran Turismo 6 and Gran Turismo Sport (which has both the Red Bull X2010 Junior and the regular one). The prototype vehicle was made to answer Kazunori Yamauchi's question: "If you built the fastest racing car on land, one that throws aside all rules and regulations, what would that car look like, how would it perform, and how would it feel to drive?" The vehicle was designed by Adrian Newey in conjunction with Yamauchi. It features enclosed wheels and a "fan element" to increase low and medium-speed downforce, much like a Chaparral 2J.

Racing record 

As a constructor, Red Bull Racing have achieved the following statistics:

 Constructors' Championships winning percentage: 
 Drivers' Championships winning percentage: 
 Winning percentage: 

(Bold indicates championships won.)

* Season still in progress.

References

External links 

 
 Red Bull Junior Team

 
2004 establishments in the United Kingdom
Red Bull sports teams
Formula One entrants
Austrian auto racing teams
Austrian racecar constructors
British auto racing teams
British racecar constructors
Companies based in Milton Keynes
Sport in Milton Keynes
Formula One World Constructors' Champions
Auto racing teams established in 2004